The Western Australian University Regiment (WAUR) is an Australian Army Reserve training unit for the 13th Brigade.

Unit history
The regiment was founded as the Perth University Regiment on 22 April 1949 to provide military training to university undergraduates and located at Crawley, Western Australia. It was renamed the Western Australian University Regiment in May 1950.

Alliances
 - The Royal Green Jackets (1955)

Notes

Regiments of Australia
Military units and formations established in 1949
University of Western Australia
Military Units in Western Australia